The 2016 Shanghai International Film Festival was the 19th such festival devoted to international cinema held in Shanghai, China.

International Jury
The members of the jury for the Golden Goblet Award were:

 Emir Kusturica (Serbian director, musician, actor, producer, writer and architect)
 Atom Egoyan (Canadian director)
 Daniele Luchetti (Italian director)
 Karena Lam (Chinese HK actress)
 Pema Tseden (Chinese director, screenwriter)
 Abderrahmane Sissako (Mauritanian director, producer)
 Yan Geling (Chinese American novelist, screenwriter)

In Competition

Winners

Golden Goblet Awards
 Best Feature Film: De Lan by Liu Jie 
 Jury Grand Prix: See You in Texas by Vito Palmieri 
 Best Director: Antti Jokinen for Flowers of Evil  
 Best Actor: Liu Ye for Cock and Bull 
 Best Actress: Naomi Fujiyama for The Projects 
 Best Screenplay: Andreas Gruber for  
 Best Cinematography: Guo Daming for Soul on a String 
 Artistic Contribution: HAZE by Ralston Jover

Asian New Talent Award
Best Film: Thithi 
Best Director: Jacob Chen for Lost Daughter 
Best Scriptwriter: Thithi 
Best Actor: Qin Yong for Nirvana 
Best Actress: Sun Yi for Pleasure. Love.
Best Cinematography: The Island Funeral

China Movie Channel Media Award 
 
Best Film: The Song of Cotton
Best Director: Larry Yang for Mountain Cry
Best Scriptwriter: Larry Yang for Mountain Cry 
Best Actor: Wallace Chung for Three
Best Actress: Yan Bingyan for The Song of Cotton
Best Supporting Actor: Tengger for For a Few Bullets
Best Supporting Actress: Ai Liya for The Song of Cotton
Best New Director: Zhu Yuancheng for The Song of Cotton
Best New Actor: Austin Lin for At Cafe 6
Best New Actress: Cherry Ngan for At Cafe 6
Media's Anticipated Films: The Dead End, Mr. Six, XuanzangMedia's Anticipated Newcomer of the Year: Kris Wu
Media's Anticipated Actor of the Year: Nicholas Tse
Special Jury Award: Farewell My ConcubineJackie Chan Action Movie Awards
 Best Action Movie: Ip Man 3 (Hong Kong) 
 Best Action Movie Director: Wilson Yip for Ip Man 3 (Hong Kong) 
 Best Action Choreographer: Jon DeVore for Point Break (United States)
 Best Action Movie Actor: Owen Wilson for No Escape (United States)
 Best Action Movie Actress: Zhang Jingchu for For a Few Bullets (China)
 Best Action Movie New Performer: Han Sang-hyuk for Chasing (South Korea)
 Best Special Effects: Jeb Corliss for Point Break (United States)
 Best Fight: Ip Man 3'' (Hong Kong)

Notes

References

External links
Official website

Shanghai International Film Festival
Shanghai International Film Festival
Shanghai
Shanghai
21st century in Shanghai